The Bergen County Special Services School District is a special education public school district based in Paramus, serving the educational needs of classified students ages 3 to 21 from Bergen County, New Jersey, United States. Established in 1971, it was the first of eight special services districts established in the state.

As of the 2021–22 school year, the district, comprised of six schools, had an enrollment of NA students and 201.8 classroom teachers (on an FTE basis), for a student–teacher ratio of NA:1.

History
The New Jersey Legislature passed an act in 1971 that created the school district.

In 1995 the administrations of this district and Bergen County Technical Schools (BCTS) combined with BCTS's administration team prevailing.

Administration
Core members of the district's administration are:
Dr. Howard Lerner, Superintendent
John Susino, Business Administrator / Board Secretary

Schools and programs
Schools in the district (with 2021–22 enrollment data from the National Center for Education Statistics) are:
 Norman A. Bleshman Regional Day School (Paramus) - School for multiply impaired (with 71 students; grades 9-12)
 Programs at other campuses
 Bogota Program (at Bogota Junior/Senior High School)
 Visions Becton (at Henry P. Becton Regional High School)
 Visions Paramus Elementary (at Parkway School)
 Visions Middle School Paramus (at Westbrook Middle School)
 Visions Paramus High School (at Paramus High School)

References

External links
Bergen County Special Services School District

Data for the Bergen County Special Services School District, National Center for Education Statistics

1971 establishments in New Jersey
Paramus, New Jersey
School districts in Bergen County, New Jersey
School districts established in 1971